Eleanor de Montfort, Princess of Wales and Lady of Snowdon (1252 – 19 June 1282) was an English noble and Welsh Princess. She was the daughter of Simon de Montfort, 6th Earl of Leicester and Eleanor of England.  She was also the second woman who can be shown to have used the title Princess of Wales.

Early life
Eleanor's maternal grandparents were King John of England and his Queen consort, Isabella of Angoulême. 
Her maternal uncles included the King of England, Henry of Winchester, and the King of the Romans, Richard of Cornwall. Her maternal aunts included the Queen of Scotland, Joan of England; the Holy Roman Empress, Queen of Germany and Queen of Sicily, Isabella of England; and the wife of the Prince of Wales, Joan, Lady of Wales.

When Eleanor was thirteen years old, her father Simon de Montfort, and brother Lord Henry were killed at the Battle of Evesham (4 August 1265). According to the chroniclers, Nicholas Trivet, William Rishanger and others, Earl Simon had earlier made an alliance with Llywelyn ap Gruffudd, whereby it was agreed that Llywelyn and Eleanor would marry.
After Earl Simon's death, his family was forced to flee the Kingdom of England: Countess Eleanor took her daughter to the safety of the Dominican nunnery at Montargis, France, a Montfort foundation.

Marriage to Llywelyn ap Gruffydd
Eleanor’s mother Countess Eleanor died in the Spring of 1275. Shortly after, Eleanor de Montfort married Llywelyn ap Gruffudd, Prince of Wales, by marriage per nuncios (proxy marriage) or per verba de presenti, which was endorsed by Canon Law.

Capture and imprisonment by Edward I
Eleanor began the sea voyage from France to north Wales, avoiding making a land passage through England.
The two ships carrying Eleanor, her brother Amaury and their entourage, sailing off the south coast of England, were captured by sailors from the port of Bristol, just off the Isles of Scilly. 
Six named men together with the crews of four ships of Bristol were rewarded with a payment of 220 marks.
'Thomas Larchdeacon', 'Thomas the Archdeacon', who masterminded the capture on behalf of her first cousin Edward I of England was paid £20 in May 1276 by the king's orders, through the sheriff of Cornwall.

Eleanor was taken by ship to Bristol, then held prisoner at Windsor for nearly three years.
She was released in 1278 following the signing of the Treaty of Aberconwy between Edward I of England and Llywelyn ap Gruffydd.

Married life
Eleanor and Llywelyn were formally married (secundum formam ecclesie) at the cathedral door, as was the custom, of the cathedral church at Worcester, on the Feast Day of St Edward, 1278; Edward gave the bride, his cousin, away and paid for the wedding feast. 
Before the wedding mass was celebrated, Edward insisted that Llywelyn should put his seal to an adjustment to the agreement that they had previously made. 
Llywelyn had no alternative but to comply, and he later stated that he did it under duress, 'moved by the fear that can grip a steadfast man'.

Following the ceremony, Eleanor became officially known as Princess of Wales and Lady of Snowdon.

Death and legacy
Eleanor had two daughters. Princess Catherine married to Philip ap Ivor, Lord of Cardigan. For Gwenllian of Wales, she died giving birth to her on 19 June 1282 at the royal palace in Abergwyngregyn, on the north coast of Gwynedd. Her body was taken across the Lafan Sands to the Franciscan Friary at Llanfaes, Anglesey. 
The Friary had been founded by Llywelyn the Great, the grandfather of Llywelyn ap Gruffudd, in memory of his wife Joan (Eleanor's aunt).

On 12 July 1282, members of Eleanor's personal household were given safe-conduct while travelling back into England. Llywelyn ap Gruffudd was killed on 11 December 1282. His one-year-old daughter, Gwenllian, was captured the following year by English forces. Edward I had the child banished to the remote Sempringham Priory in Lincolnshire, where she remained until her death in 1337.

Ancestors

Notes

References
 
 Fawcett, Joan M. "The Household Roll of Eleanor de Montfort, 1265." History Today (1951) 1#11 pp 41-43.
 Kjær, Lars. "Food, drink and ritualised communication in the household of Eleanor de Montfort, February to August 1265." Journal of Medieval History 37.1 (2011): 75-89 online.
 Wilkinson, Louise J. Eleanor de Montfort: A rebel countess in medieval England (Bloomsbury Publishing, 2012).

1252 births
1282 deaths
House of Montfort
Deaths in childbirth
Princesses of Wales
Welsh royalty
Daughters of British earls
13th-century Welsh nobility
13th-century Welsh women
13th-century English nobility
13th-century English women